Lead Me On is the debut album of American blues singer and guitarist Kelly Joe Phelps. It is his first release on the Burnside label before moving to Rykodisc Records.

Reception

Writing for Allmusic, music critic Roch Parisien wrote of the album "This is the real deal — Phelps performs with the full authority and authenticity of the Delta blues tradition without ever once sounding like a Folkways museum piece."

Track listing
All songs written by Kelly Joe Phelps except as noted.
"I've Been Converted" (Traditional) – 6:16
"Hard Time Killin' Floor Blues" (Skip James) – 5:24
"Where Do I Go Now" – 5:33
"Love Me Baby Blues" (Joe Calicott) – 4:41
"Lead Me On" – 4:46
"Jesus Make up My Dying Bed" (Traditional) – 5:17
"Leavin' Blues" (Herman Johnson) – 5:54
"Marking Stone Blues" – 4:58
"The Black Crow Keeps Flying" – 4:17
"I'd Be a Rich Man" – 4:44
"Someone to Save Me" – 6:35
"Motherless Children" (Traditional)– 7:24
"Fare Thee Well" – 4:33

Personnel
Kelly Joe Phelps - vocals, guitar, stomp box
Engineered by Mike Moore
Executive producer – Terry Carrier
Photos by James Rexroad, Project 47

References

External links
Discography at Kelly Joe Phelps official web site.

1994 debut albums
Kelly Joe Phelps albums